Biomeigenia is a genus of flies in the family Tachinidae.

Species
B. auripollinosa Chao & Liu, 1986
B. flava Chao, 1964
B. gynandromima Mesnil, 1961
B. magna Mesnil, 1961

References

Diptera of Asia
Exoristinae
Tachinidae genera